A peak organisation or peak body is an Australian term for an advocacy group or trade association, an association of industries or groups with allied interests.  They are generally established for the purposes of developing standards and processes, or to act on behalf of all members when lobbying government or promoting the interests of the members.

While there is no official granting of Peak Body status, peak bodies are widely accepted as the legitimate "voice" or representative of a profession or industry, as opposed to just a geographic/commercial/cultural/political subset of that profession, as evidenced by requests for media comment and inclusion in government consultations. They often have to present codes of conduct or ethics which can be used in legal cases determining negligence, can conduct industry-focused lobbying, and also can be providers of mandatory industry training.

In the commercial sector they allow competing companies to meet to discuss common issues without the risk of breaching the Competition and Consumer Act 2010 which outlaws collusion between competitors which would affect the operation of a free market.

Examples
Examples of Australia-wide organisations include:

 Australian Breastfeeding Association
 Australian Chamber of Commerce and Industry
 Australian Conservation Foundation
 Australian Council of Social Service
 Australian Council of Trade Unions
 Australian Dads Network
 Australian Hotels Association
 Australian Industry Group
 Australian School of Entrepreneurship (ASE)
 Australian Youth Affairs Coalition
 Avner Pancreatic Cancer Foundation
 Business Council of Australia
 Carers Australia
 Commercial Radio Australia
 EduGrowth
 Environmental Health Australia
 FreeTV Australia
 Foundation for Young Australians (FYA)
 Governance Institute of Australia
 Home Education Association, Australia
 ME/CFS Australia 
 Migration Alliance
 Minerals Council of Australia
 Muscular Dystrophy Foundation Australia
 National Academies Forum
 National Farmers Federation
 National LGBTI Health Alliance
People With Disability Australia
 Pharmaceutical Society of Australia
 Printing Industries Association of Australia
 Public Relations Institute of Australia
 Plastics Industry Pipe Association of Australia
 Rare Voices Australia
 Scarlet Alliance
 Sleep Disorders Australia
 Strata Community Association
 Universities Australia
 Volunteering Australia
 Wireless Institute of Australia

State-wide organisations
 Conservation Council of South Australia
 South Australian Literary Societies' Union
 VACCHO - Victorian Aboriginal Community Controlled Health Organization

See also 
Pressure group
Ginger group
Special Interest Group

References 

Australian English
 

de:Spitzenverband